Bennett Altman Miller (born December 30, 1966) is an American film director, known for directing the acclaimed films Capote (2005), Moneyball (2011), and Foxcatcher (2014). He has been nominated twice for the Academy Award for Best Director.

Early life and education
Miller was born in New York City to a painter mother and an engineer father. In his youth he knew writer Dan Futterman and actor Philip Seymour Hoffman. He and Futterman were classmates at Mamaroneck High School, and all three participated in the New York State Summer School of the Arts. The three would later collaborate on Capote.

Miller attended New York University's Tisch School of the Arts, with Hoffman again as a classmate, but dropped out shortly before he would have graduated.

While attending NYU, Miller was a founding member of the short-lived Bullstoi Ensemble theater company along with Hoffman and fellow actor Steven Schub. It was during this time that Miller, Hoffman and Schub made a pact that if any of them ever won an Academy Award, their entire acceptance speech would consist of nothing but barking.

Career
Miller began his film career directing the 1998 documentary The Cruise. As described by Wheeler Winston Dixon, the film documented the "tough life of a tour guide on a New York City bus", and was made using handheld digital cameras. It was a surprise hit, and opened up numerous doors for Miller.

Miller turned down several offers of film projects, until he was able to get support to make the film Capote with Philip Seymour Hoffman, who played Truman Capote. The film premiered in September 2005 at the Telluride Film Festival and was released by Sony Pictures Classics.

In 2006 Miller directed the Bob Dylan music video When the Deal Goes Down starring Scarlett Johansson.  Then, in 2008 he directed Johansson's music video for her Tom Waits cover of Falling Down featuring an appearance by Salman Rushdie.

In 2009, Miller was hired by Columbia Pictures to direct the film Moneyball, based on the 2003 book of the same name by Michael Lewis, after its previously-hired director, Steven Soderbergh, clashed with producers over the tone of the film. The resulting film, released in 2011, was a critical and commercial success.

Miller's most recent film is Foxcatcher (2014), starring Steve Carell, Channing Tatum and Mark Ruffalo, a film he began developing in 2006 with Gary Oldman as the lead. The film, produced by Annapurna Pictures and released by Sony Pictures Classics, became a critical success. In his review for Rolling Stone, Peter Travers called the film "a new peak" for Miller, who "takes a scalpel to the privileged worlds of Olympic sports and inherited wealth." It was nominated for five Academy Awards, including Best Director (Miller), Best Actor (Carell), Best Supporting Actor (Ruffalo), and Best Original Screenplay (E. Max Frye and Dan Futterman).

Miller has directed 6 actors to Oscar nominations: Philip Seymour Hoffman and Catherine Keener for Capote, Brad Pitt and Jonah Hill for Moneyball, and Steve Carell and Mark Ruffalo for Foxcatcher. Hoffman won the Oscar for his work in Capote.

, Miller appears to be working on a documentary on the topic of future technologies featuring contributions by academics and experts in the field such as Danny Hillis, Ray Kurzweil, Kevin Esvelt and Sherry Turkle.

Commercials

Miller also directs commercials.

In 1999, Miller directed a campaign of :30 television ads for the Charlotte Hornets.

Personal life
In a 2014 interview, Miller described himself as "a tumbleweed", saying, "I don't have a company. I don't have a staff. I don't own anything -- I've never owned a car or an apartment."

Filmography

Accolades

Miller was nominated for the Academy Award for Best Director for Capote (2005) and Foxcatcher (2014). He was also nominated for the David Lean Award for Direction at the BAFTAs in 2006.

He won the Best Director Award at the 2014 Cannes Film Festival for Foxcatcher, which was also part of the main competition for the Palme d'Or.

References

External links
 

1966 births
Living people
Film directors from New York City
American film producers
Tisch School of the Arts alumni
American documentary film directors
American documentary film producers
Mamaroneck High School alumni
Cannes Film Festival Award for Best Director winners